Electropop is the second studio album by pop/ electronic dance/ hip hop music group Jupiter Rising  released by Chime Entertainment on September 11, 2007. The album featured the singles Electropop and Go!.

Critical response

The album received positive reviews. Lauren Mooney's of URB Magazine review of the album (and Jessie Payo) is very positive:
Before dismissing Jessie Payo as just another pretty face in the mass production of dance tracks, listen to what Jupiter Rising's founder Spencer Nezey has to say, "I know I can trust Jessie. Without her, there would be no Electropop." Sounds serious. In the first single that shares the same title as the album, Jessie sings "I may be your sweet spot/Take me to your candy shop." Layer in some old-school beats and synth and you've got a catchy track that manages to sound fresh and retro at the same time. Splendid. 
Evan Sawdey of PopMatters had this to say about the album:
“Hero” is the big Mariah-styled ballad, but Payo never overuses her pipes like Mimi does: she has the occasional flutter, but that’s it. Her vocal presence is distinct, powerful, and full of personality. Same goes for Nezey’s productions, even though he can’t really decide if he wants to be the next David Foster or the next Timbaland. The excellent “Go!” is Nelly Furtado with a rock edge, and “Foolish” comes off like a great Amy Winehouse B-side (even if its bridge is a little weak). Even with the great moments of genre deviations (like the jazz-pop of “They Say"), Jupiter Rising feels most comfortable when they’re up-tempo. The title track has the flirtatious banter of Furtado’s “Promiscuous”, a ready-made synth club beat, and even gives a slight name drop for 50 Cent’s “Candy Shop”—it’s ridiculous fun. Notice all the name-dropping that’s been going on? Jupiter Rising never pretend to be doing anything profoundly different—they’re just taking the best parts of all their favorite songs and styles and mixing them together into on concise little album. Electropop is far from groundbreaking, but who needs to be revolutionary when you’re having so much fun?

Track listing

Singles and music videos

"Electropop"
"Electropop" was released to digital stores on June 19, 2007. The music video was released 3 days after. Electropop charted 15th on the Hot Dance Music/Club Airplay and 17th on Billboard's Hot Dance Airplay. The Remixes EP was released November 20, 2007.

"Wicked"
"Wicked Remix EP" was made available for digital download on May 6, 2008.

Credits
Ron Coro -Creative Director, Logo Design
Samuel Formicola- Group
Ludvig Girdland -Strings, Group
Bob Glaub -Bass
Marc Greene -Engineer
Robert Hadley -Mastering
Quincy McCrary -Piano, Keyboards, Vocals (background)
Paul Mirkovich -String Arrangements
Spencer Nezey -Synthesizer, Composer, Keyboards, Programming, Vocals, Producer, Beatbox
Jessie Payo -Vocals, Harmony Vocals, Group Member
Christopher "Kid" Reid -MC, Guest Appearance
Mike Shapiro -Bass, Percussion, Drums
Joe Smith -Engineer
Caleb Speir -Bass
Alan Steinberger -Piano, Keyboards
Cameron Stone -Strings, Group
Craig Stull Guitar (Electric), Spanish Guitar
Ian Suddarth -Engineer
Marc Tanner- Producer, A&R
Jason Villaroman- Producer, Engineer
Ethan Willoughby- Mixing

References

2007 albums
Jupiter Rising albums